Ciro y los Persas is a rock band from Argentina led by singer and songwriter Andrés Ciro Martínez, best known as the former singer of Los Piojos. The band had its first performances in December 2009 in Rosario and Córdoba. In 2010 they released their first album, Espejos, which went double platinum. The band toured the country, highlighted by opening for Paul McCartney's  concerts at River Plate Stadium in November.

Discography 
 Espejos (2010)
 27 (2012)
 Naranja Persa (2016/18)
 Guerras (Un viaje en el tiempo) (2020)
 Sueños (Un viaje en el tiempo) (2022)

External links 

Official site web 

Argentine rock music groups